Broadcast is a monthly magazine for the United Kingdom television and radio industry, owned by Media Business Insight.

History
Broadcast was started in 1973 by Rod Allen, who went on to work at LWT, HTV and HarperCollinsInteractive. He was most recently head of the Department of Journalism at City University, London, until he retired in 2006.

Description
The magazine covers a wide range of news and issues affecting the professional broadcast market in the UK. It has regular monthly sections covering news, commissioning, facilities, analysis, opinion, interview, platforms, production and ratings. Broadcast also often has a special feature covering an issue relevant to the industry. It is owned by Media Business Insight, a publishing, events and information business that also includes Screen International.

Notable former staff 
 Dan Wootton (former News of the World TV editor)

Awards

Since 1996 the magazine has conferred the annual Broadcast Awards, in a ceremony held at the Grosvenor House Hotel in London, to recognise and reward excellence in and around the UK television programming industry. Additionally, each June since 2005, the magazine has held the annual Broadcast Digital Channel Awards specifically for the digital TV industry, recognising and rewarding innovation, creativity and commercial success.

In 2019 the Broadcast Tech Innovation Awards were instituted to celebrate the exceptional teams behind the most outstanding broadcast productions of the year, and 2021 saw the inaugural Broadcast Sport Awards.

Broadcast Awards

2022 nominations and winners

2021 nominations and winners

2020 nominations and winners

2019 nominations and winners

2018 nominations and winners

2017 nominations and winners

2016 nominations and winners 

{| class=wikitable style=font-size:100%
|+21st annual awards presented: 10 February 2016 – Host: Jonathan Ross
! style="background:#FAEB86;" width="34%"| Best Children's Programme
! style="background:#FAEB86;" width="33%"| Best Comedy Programme
! style="background:#FAEB86;" width="33%"| Best Daytime Programme
|-
| valign="top" |
 So Awkward
 Eve
 Horrible Histories Special: Awesome Alfred the Great
 I am Leo (CBBC)
 My Life: Mr Alzheimers and Me (CBBC)
 Punk Chef: Kids Challenge (Community Channel)
| valign="top" |
 Catastrophe
 Peter Kay's Car Share
 Detectorists
 Inside No. 9
 The Keith Lemon Sketch Show
 People Just Do Nothing
| valign="top" |
 The People Remember (BBC One)
 Blitz Cities – Liverpool (BBC One)
 The Chase
 Judge Rinder
 Posh Pawnbrokers
 Who's Doing the Dishes? 
|-
! style="background:#FAEB86;" width="34%"| Best Documentary Programme
! style="background:#FAEB86;" width="33%"| Best Documentary Series
! style="background:#FAEB86;" width="33%"| Best Drama Series or Serial
|-
| valign="top" |
 The Paedophile Hunter (Channel 4)
 Breaking into Britain - The Lorry Jumpers (Channel 4)
 Citizenfour
 Filming My Father: In Life and Death (Channel 5)
 Storyville: "India's Daughter"
 Tales of the Grim Sleeper
| valign="top" |
 The Romanians are Coming (Channel 4)
 24 Hours in Police Custody
 Dementiaville (Channel 4)
 Hunters of the South Seas (BBC Two)
 The Detectives
 The Tribe
| valign="top" |
 Doctor Foster
 Humans
 The Missing
 No Offence
 Poldark
 Wolf Hall
|-
! style="background:#FAEB86;" width="34%"| Best Entertainment Programme
! style="background:#FAEB86;" width="33%"| Best Multichannel Programme
! style="background:#FAEB86;" width="33%"| Best Music Programme
|-
| valign="top" |
 Britain's Got Talent
 A League of Their Own
 Alan Davies: As Yet Untitled
 Release the Hounds
 Taskmaster 
 You're Back in the Room
| valign="top" |
 Reggie Yates' Extreme Russia (BBC Three) Detectorists
 The Enfield Haunting
 Plebs
 General Election Night Coverage (Sky Arts)
 The Unbreakables: Life and Love on Disability Campus (BBC Three)
| valign="top" |
 Four to the Floor The BRIT Awards 2015 (ITV)
 Ed Sheeran: Storytellers Live (VH1)
 Glastonbury 2015 (BBC Two)
 Ten Pieces
 VE Day 70: A Party to Remember (BBC One)
|-
! style="background:#FAEB86;" width="34%"| Best News/Current Affairs Programme
! style="background:#FAEB86;" width="33%"| Best Original Programme
! style="background:#FAEB86;" width="33%"| Best Popular Factual Programme
|-
| valign="top" |
 Dispatches: "Escape from ISIS" Al Jazeera Investigates: "Inside Kenya’s Death Squads"
 BBC News at Ten: "Tunisia Terror Attack"
 Dispatches: "Kids in Crisis"
 Panorama: "To Walk Again"
 Sky News: "Tunisia Terror Attack"
| valign="top" |
 Peter Kay's Car Share Ballot Monkeys
 CyberBully
 Murder in Successville
 No Offence
 The Tribe
| valign="top" |
 The Secret Life of 4 Year Olds (Channel 4) Back in Time for Dinner
 The Great British Bake Off
 The Island with Bear Grylls
 Top Gear
 Walking the Nile (Channel 4)
|-
! style="background:#FAEB86;" width="34%"| Best Post Production House
! style="background:#FAEB86;" width="33%"| Best Best Pre-School Programme
! style="background:#FAEB86;" width="33%"| Best Single Drama
|-
| valign="top" |
 Halo Post Production Encore
 Envy
 Flix Facilities
 Molinare 
 Technicolor
| valign="top" |
 Clangers Bing
 Rastamouse
 Teacup Travels
 Toot the Tiny Tugboat
 Topsy and Tim
| valign="top" |
 Marvellous An Inspector Calls
 Black Mirror: "White Christmas"
 Cyberbully
 Danny and the Human Zoo
 The Lost Honour of Christopher Jefferies
|-
! style="background:#FAEB86;" width="34%"| Best Soap/Continuing Drama
! style="background:#FAEB86;" width="33%"| Best Sports Programme
! style="background:#FAEB86;" width="33%"| International Programme Sales
|-
| valign="top" |
 Emmerdale Casualty
 Coronation Street
 EastEnders
 Holby City
 Hollyoaks
| valign="top" |
 The 2015 Ashes (Sky Sports) The Derby (Channel 4)
 European Rugby Champions Cup Final (BT Sport)
 Isle of Man TT (ITV4)
 The 2014 Ryder Cup (Sky Sports)
 NFL Superbowl (Channel 4)
| valign="top" |
 Fortitude
 Downton Abbey
 Homes by The Sea
 Poldark
 The Missing
 Wolf Hall
|-
! style="background:#FAEB86;" width="33%"| Best Independent Production Company
! style="background:#FAEB86;" width="33%"| Channel of the Year
! style="background:#FAEB86;" width="33%"| Special Recognition Award
|-
| valign="top" |
 Tiger Aspect Productions Endor Productions 
 The Garden Productions
 ITN Productions
 Kudos Film and Television
 Twofour
| valign="top" |
 Channel 4 BBC One
 BBC Two
 Channel 5
 Dave
 ITV
| valign="top" |Have I Got News for You''|}

 2015 nominations and winners 

 2014 nominations and winners 

 2013 nominations and winners 

 2012 nominations and winners 

 2011 nominations and winners 

 2001–2010 winners Best Children's Programme2010: Bookaboo
2009: Holi Hana / Hana's Helpline (S4C / Channel 5)
2008: My Life as a Popat
2007: Charlie and Lola
2006: Serious Arctic
2005: Tracy Beaker: The Movie of Me
2004: Balamory: "The Lost Letter"
2003: My Parents Are AliensBest Entertainment Programme2010: The X Factor
2009: The Apprentice
2008: Never Mind the Buzzcocks
2007: How Do You Solve a Problem like Maria?
2006: Ant & Dec's Saturday Night Takeaway
2005: I'm a Celebrity... Get Me Out of Here!
2004: Friday Night with Jonathan Ross
2003: Pop IdolBest Daytime Programme2010: Land Girls
2009: The Estate We're In (BBC)
2008: The Paul O'Grady Show
2007: Deal or No Deal
2006: The Paul O'Grady ShowBest Music Programme2010: Later Live... with Jools Holland
2009: Glastonbury 2008 (BBC)Best Documentary Series2010: Terry Pratchett: Living with Alzheimer's (BBC Two)
2009: The Genius of Charles Darwin
2008: Meet The Natives (Channel 4)
2007: Planet Earth: "From Pole To Pole"
2006: The Power of Nightmares
2005: Brat Camp
2004: OperatunityBest Documentary Programme2010: Man on Wire
2009: My Street (Channel 4)
2008: Dispatches: "China's Stolen Children"
2007: True Stories: Sisters in Law (More4)
2006: The Real Sex Traffic
2005: The Secret Policeman
2004: Cutting Edge: "Bad Behaviour"Best Comedy Programme2010: Outnumbered
2009: Gavin & Stacey
2008: The Thick of It Special
2007: Extras
2006: The Catherine Tate Show
2005: Little Britain
2004: Bo' Selecta!Best Multichannel Programme2010: The Inbetweeners
2009: Ross Kemp in Afghanistan
2008: Gavin & Stacey
2007: The Virgin Diaries
2006: Long Way Round
2005: Brainiac: Science Abuse
2004: Monkey DustBest Drama Series or Serial Programme2010: The Street
2009: Criminal Justice
2008: Skins
2007: Bleak House
2006: Doctor Who
2005: Shameless
2004: State of PlayBest News/Current Affairs Programme2010: Pakistan: Terror's Frontline (Sky News)
2009: Zimbabwe: The Stolen Ballots (GuardianFilms)
2008: Zimbabwe – The Tyranny and the Tragedy (ITV News)
2007: Granada Reports: "The Morecambe Bay Cockling Trial" (ITV)
2006: London Bombing 7 July (Sky News)
2005: Beslan school siege (ITN)
2004: Newsnight: "Blair Special"Best Original Programme2010: Being Human
2009: Gordon Ramsay: Cookalong Live
2008: Fonejacker
2007: Life on Mars
2006: The Thick of It
2005: Strictly Come Dancing
2004: Wife SwapBest Popular Factual Programme2010: Inside Nature's Giants
2009: The Choir: Boys Don't Sing
2008: Grand Designs
2007: Ramsay's Kitchen Nightmares
2006: Who Do You Think You Are?
2005: Top Gear
2004: Wife SwapBest Pre-School Programme2010: In the Night Garden...Best Soap or Continuing Drama2010: Coronation StreetBest Single Drama2010: A Short Stay in Switzerland
2009: Boy (Channel 4)
2008: The Relief of Belsen
2007: See No Evil: The Moors Murders
2006: Sex Traffic
2005: Dirty Filthy Love
2004: The Second ComingBest Sports Programme2010: Formula 1 – Monaco Grand Prix (BBC One)
2009: John Smith's Grand National Meeting 2008 (BBC One)
2008: Match of the Day 2 (BBC Two)
2007: 2006 FIFA World Cup Final (BBC One)
2006: The Ashes (Channel 4)
2005: Olympic Grandstand with Matthew Pinsent (BBC Two)
2004: Tour de France 2003 (ITV2)Channel of the Year2010: ITV1
2009: Channel 4
2008: BBC Two
2007: BBC One
2006: Channel 4
2005: Living TV
2004: BBC TwoInternational Programme Sales2010: Top Gear
2009: Come Dine with Me
2008: Dancing on Ice
2007: Dancing with the Stars
2006: Strictly Come Dancing
2005: Idols
2004: Wife SwapIndependent Production Company2010: Twofour
2009: Talkback Thames
2008: Company Pictures
2007: Kudos Film and Television
2006: RDF Media
2005: Company Pictures
2004: RDF Media
2003: Ideal World
2002: RDF
2001: Lion TelevisionPost-Production House'''
2010: Envy
2009: Envy
2008: Envy
2007: Evolutions Television
2006: The Farm
2005: The Farm
2004: The Farm
2003: Blue Post Production
2002: The Farm
2001: The Farm

Notes

References

External links
 

Ascential
Magazines established in 1973
Magazines published in London
Radio in the United Kingdom
Television magazines published in the United Kingdom
Monthly magazines published in the United Kingdom
Professional and trade magazines